David Christopher Gadsby FRS (26 March 1947 – 3 March 2019) was a British physiologist, and Patrick A. Gerschel Family Professor Emeritus at The Rockefeller University. He was best known for his studies on the mechanisms by which ions move across cell membranes.

He earned a BSc in 1969 and MSc in 1973, from Trinity College, Cambridge, and Ph.D. in 1978 from University College London. He studied with Paul F. Cranefield. He won the Kenneth S. Cole Award of the Biophysical Society in 1995. He was elected Fellow of the Royal Society in 2005.

References

External links
 
 

Alumni of Trinity College, Cambridge
Alumni of University College London
British physiologists
Fellows of the Royal Society
Rockefeller University faculty
1947 births
2019 deaths